Mawaali is a 1983 Indian Hindi-language masala film, produced by G. Hanumantha Rao by Padmalaya Studios banner, presented by Krishna and directed by K. Bapaiah. The film stars Jeetendra, Sridevi, Jaya Prada and has music composed by Bappi Lahiri. The film is a remake of Telugu film Chuttalunnaru Jagratha (1980) which also starred Sridevi, but in a different role.

Plot 
Goyal Verma is a wealthy industrialist who is surrounded by vicious relatives Ajith, his wife Laila, and their son Ranjith. To usurp his wealth, they want to knit Ranjith with Nisha the only daughter of Goyal. Due to his ill-health Goyal entrusts the factory responsibilities to Ajith which he misuses by conducting fraud and extortion. Ramesh a newly appointed engineer bars their violations. He falls for Nisha which Goyal also accepts. However, spotting Ramesh with another girl Julie. So, Goyal expels and mortifies him. Exploiting it, Ajith & Ranjith murder Goyal, whereupon, Nisha witnesses Ramesh escaping. At the judiciary, she affirms the same, but Ramesh claims guiltless and he is sent for remand. In prison, he is surprised to see his identical Gangu is a pickpocket and grasps the cause behind the misinterpretation of Goyal & Nisha. Simultaneously, he learns that Ajith is forcibly knitting Nisha with Ranjith. So, Ramesh gets out of prison by making Gangu his remitter for 3 days. He succeeds in confusing the culprits and safeguards Nisha from his mother. Accordingly, he marries her and returns. Besides, David, the father of Julie seeks Rs.5000 of reverse dowry for which Gangu reaches Ramesh's village. Anyhow, Nisha recognizes and strikes a deal with him for 3 days of stay. Meanwhile, Ajith & Ranjith find the whereabouts of Nisha and abruptly take her. Due to a misapprehension, Ramesh's mother necks out her even Gangu too. Later, she realizes her mistake and moves for Gangu's help when she discovers Ramesh & Gangu are twins. Here, Gangu makes a play with the help of Nisha & Julie and collects the pieces of evidence but they are seized. Being cognizant of it, Ramesh absconds from the prison. At last, Ramesh & Gangu cease the baddies. Finally, the movie ends on a happy note.

Cast 
Jeetendra as Ramesh / Gangu (Double Role)
Jaya Prada	as Nisha Verma
Sridevi as Julie
Kader Khan	as Ajit
Shakti Kapoor as Ranjeet
Aruna Irani as Laila
Nirupa Roy	as Ramesh's Mother
Prem Chopra as Julie's Father
Shreeram Lagoo as Goyal Verma (Nisha's Father) 
Iftekhar as Public Prosecutor

Soundtrack 

"Ui Amma, Ui Amma, Mushkil Yeh Kya Ho Gayi" was re-created as "Ooh La La" from The Dirty Picture.

References

External links 
 

1983 films
1980s Hindi-language films
Hindi remakes of Telugu films
Films directed by K. Bapayya
Films scored by Bappi Lahiri